The British Amateur Rugby League Association (BARLA) is an association for social and recreational rugby league. It works jointly with the Rugby Football League through the RFL Community Board.

History

BARLA was created in 1973 in Huddersfield at the George Hotel by a group of enthusiasts concerned about the dramatic disappearance of many amateur leagues and clubs. Fewer than 150 amateur teams remained with a mere thirty youth rugby league teams. The 'breakaway' from the RFL was acrimonious and was strongly contested with a vote 29–1 against recognising BARLA. Thanks to Tom Mitchell, this changed to a unanimous vote of approval for BARLA within twelve months.

One of BARLA's first acts was to merge the vast majority of the district leagues into five regional leagues: the Yorkshire League (initially still called the Leeds & District League), the short-lived Cumbria League, the West Yorkshire Sunday League, the Pennine League and the North Western Counties League. For geographical reasons the Hull & District League (renamed Humberside League) and the Southern League were left unmerged. This allowed clubs to play at more appropriate standards as there were more divisions, and this factor along with the improved governance of BARLA saw the standard and numbers of clubs rise quickly.

The Yorkshire County Cup and Lancashire County Cup knock-out competitions were started in 1973 as well as the BARLA National Cup.

In 1977 BARLA toured Australia and New Zealand for the first time. In that year the BARLA Young Lions made their first inaugural tour setting a lasting trend by giving future stars of the game such as David Hobbs their first taste of international rugby league.

A Cumbria County Cup was started in 1982.

The best amateur clubs were still divided between six leagues and thus the desire for an amateur National League arose. The BARLA National League first took place in the 1986/1987 season with 10 teams.

The association has always been a champion of the amateur ethos and in 1987 BARLA played a major role in the establishment of the 'free gangway' between the two codes at amateur level. The agreement allowed players to inter-change between rugby league and rugby union without fear of discrimination.

The BARLA National League soon proved popular and the 1989/90 season also saw the addition of a second division.

On 30 November 1990, BARLA's new headquarters at West Yorkshire House, Huddersfield was opened by Queen Elizabeth II.

In 1993, BARLA provided the first Great Britain team to tour South Africa. The BARLA National League was rebranded the National Conference League and expanded to three divisions (now named premier, first and second) in 1993.

By 1999, there were more than 1,400 teams and 900 youth and junior teams. On an average weekend in the season, almost 23,000 players will be in action.

BARLA's work in the international expansion of the game was recognised by their inclusion as affiliate members of the International Federation (equivalent to the International Board at the time) in 1999 and by BARLA's inclusion in the Emerging Nations World Championship in 2000.

BARLA won the Emerging Nations World Championship beating Italy 20–14 in the final.

Competitions
BARLA runs many leagues, mainly based in the 'heartland' areas of the sport (Yorkshire, Lancashire and Cumbria). The top division under their control is the National Conference League, with regional leagues including the North West Counties, Yorkshire, Cumberland, Pennine
Hull & District and Barrow & District leagues.

Its top knock-out competition is the BARLA National Cup and there are county cups for Yorkshire, Lancashire and Cumbria.

There is an InterTown Series played over the summer between sides representing different districts.

It also runs youth leagues such as the Yorkshire Combination Youth League and Hull Youth and Junior. There are county cups at age group level, known as the Yorkshire Youth Cup, Lancashire Youth Cup and the Cumbria Youth Cup.

Representative rugby league
BARLA selects an international team consisting of community players, the BARLA Lions. This team tours many parts of the rugby league world, and have competed in the Rugby League Emerging Nations Tournament. The association has made 31 tours to and from the Southern Hemisphere. These include pioneer visits with matches against Fiji, Samoa, Tonga, the Cook Islands and South Africa. In the Northern Hemisphere games have been played against Moldova, Russia, Morocco Pakistan and the US.

Cumbria
North West Allerdale, Barrow & South Lakes, Copeland and Eden

North West
Halton, Lancashire, Rochdale, Oldham, Salford, St Helens, Warrington & Cheshire, Wigan & Leigh, Fylde

Yorkshire
Bradford, Calderdale, Hull, Kirklees, Leeds, North Yorkshire, South Yorkshire, Wakefield

Non-heartlands
London & South East, North East, Scotland, Wales

See also

 Rugby Football League
 Rugby League Emerging Nations Tournament
 Victory Cup
 Rugby league in England

External links
 BARLA official website
 Lancashire Service Area
 Hull & District Youth & Junior
 Yorkshire Combination Youth League

Amateur rugby league
Rugby
Organisations based in Huddersfield
Sports organizations established in 1973
Rugby league governing bodies in Europe
Rugby league in the United Kingdom
Sport in Huddersfield
Rugby
1973 establishments in the United Kingdom